The 1982 Peter Jackson Classic was contested from July 1–4 at St. George's Golf and Country Club. It was the 10th edition of the Peter Jackson Classic, and the fourth edition as a major championship on the LPGA Tour.

This event was won by Sandra Haynie.

Final leaderboard

External links
 Golf Observer source

Canadian Women's Open
Sports competitions in Toronto
Peter Jackson Classic
Peter Jackson Classic
Peter Jackson Classic